In mathematics and statistics, Skorokhod's representation theorem is a result that shows that a weakly convergent sequence of probability measures whose limit measure is sufficiently well-behaved can be represented as the distribution/law of a pointwise convergent sequence of random variables defined on a common probability space. It is named for the Soviet mathematician A. V. Skorokhod.

Statement

See also
 Convergence in distribution

References

  (see p. 7 for weak convergence, p. 24 for convergence in distribution and p. 70 for Skorokhod's theorem)

Probability theorems
Theorems in statistics